Cambodge Soir was a weekly newspaper published in Cambodia and it was the most important French language Cambodian newspaper of the country. It was edited in Phnom Penh and distributed in different Cambodian provinces, among French speaking foreigners and Cambodians.  The newspaper closed down in 2010.

History

On September 11, 1993, Éditions du Mékong, a private French-Cambodian corporation, created a bimonthly publication known as Le Mékong.

On May, 1995 Le Mékong changed the name to Cambodge Soir Info (Cambodian Evening) and was published Mondays, Wednesdays and Fridays only.

In July 1997, Cambodge Soir Info became a daily.

In March 2007 was created officially the Internet version of the printing publication under the same name: Cambodge Soir Info.

In June 2007 the edition is stopped.

In October 2007 it is opened again under the new name of Cambodge Soir Hebdo to be published every Tuesday.

On November 16, 2009, the Cambodian journalist Ung Chansophea won the French Freedom of Press prize for a report he did on mistreated women in Cambodia.

2010. The company stopped trading and closed the newspaper and ceased publication.

June 2011 H2O Media office opens in old building.

References

See also 
List of newspapers in Cambodia

Notes

Newspapers published in Cambodia
Newspapers established in 1993
Mass media in Phnom Penh
Publications disestablished in 2010
Defunct weekly newspapers
French-language newspapers published in Asia